Bo Koster (born August 22, 1974) is an American keyboardist and record producer.  He is best known for his work as a member of the band My Morning Jacket and as a touring musician with Roger Waters and Ray LaMontagne.

Early life 
Koster grew up in Lakewood, Ohio, a city in the Greater Cleveland Metropolitan Area. He attended Lakewood High School, Cleveland Institute of Music and Berklee College of Music.

Career

My Morning Jacket

In 2003, Koster became a member of the band My Morning Jacket.  The band's sound, rooted in rock, alternative, and alt-country, is often experimental and psychedelic.  The group amassed a large following beginning in the early 2000s, in part due to their powerful live performances.  In 2005, their album Z was universally acclaimed as one of the best albums of that year.  The band has also been nominated for a Grammy three times in the Best Alternative Music Album category.

Roger Waters

In 2017 and 2018, Koster was part of the Roger Waters Us + Them world tour and subsequently appeared in the companion film Us + Them. He had previously performed with Waters when My Morning Jacket backed him at the Newport Folk Festival in 2015.

Ray LaMontagne

In 2016, he joined Ray LaMontagne and other members of My Morning Jacket for the Ouroborous tour. Later, in 2018, he appeared on LaMontagne's album Part Of The Light.

Other work

Koster has also collaborated with Neko Case, T Bone Burnett, City & Colour, Strand Of Oaks, Carl Broemel, Young The Giant, Laura Viers, Sam Outlaw, and Delta Spirit.  In 2010, he co-produced the Delta Spirit album History from Below.

Prior to joining My Morning Jacket, Koster worked on several television documentaries as an associate producer, including Modern Marvels and Haunted History.

Personal life 
Koster is an avid basketball fan, especially of his hometown team the Cleveland Cavaliers. He currently resides in Los Angeles, CA.

Discography

With My Morning Jacket 
 Z (2005)
Okonokos (2006)
 Evil Urges (2008)
 Circuital (2011)
 The Waterfall (2015)
The Waterfall II (2020)

References

External links 
About.me page
Bo Koster discography at Discogs

Living people
1974 births
American rock keyboardists
Record producers from Ohio
My Morning Jacket members
21st-century American musicians
Musicians from Ohio
People from Lakewood, Ohio